The Broken Marriage Vow is a 2022 Philippine drama television series broadcast by Kapamilya Channel. Directed by Connie Macatuno and Andoy Ranay, it stars Jodi Sta. Maria, Zanjoe Marudo, Sue Ramirez, and Zaijian Jaranilla. It is based on the British drama series Doctor Foster. It premiered on Kapamilya Channel's Primetime Bida evening block, Jeepney TV, A2Z Primetime Weeknights, and TV5's Todo Max Primetime Singko, and worldwide via The Filipino Channel and Kapatid Channel from January 24 to June 24, 2022, replacing Marry Me, Marry You and was replaced by A Family Affair.

Plot
A seemingly perfect family is shattered by broken trust and infidelity.

Dr. Jill Illustre's (Jodi Sta. Maria) life unravels when she discovers her husband, David (Zanjoe Marudo), is having an affair. His mistress, Lexy Lucero (Sue Ramirez), is the daughter of one of her patients, and whose father is a major backer of her architect husband's housing development project in Baguio, a beautiful mountain city in the Philippines’ northern island of Luzon.

Baguio is a small resort city where everyone knows everyone, and secrets are hard to hide. Jill is incensed when she learns that all of their mutual friends and colleagues are aware of David’s indiscretions and are keeping them from her. Jill sees photos of David and Lexy as a couple socializing with their friends. Her anger reaches a tipping point when she discovers that Lexy is pregnant.

A chain of events follows resulting in catastrophic effects in the lives of the couple, their son Gio (Zaijian Jaranilla), and everyone else involved.

Cast and characters

Main
 Jodi Sta. Maria as Dr. Jill Victorino, M.D. – She is one of Baguio’s renowned and respected internal medicine doctors at Pine Hill Medical Hospital, and a professor at the hospital’s medical school. David’s first wife and Gio’s mother.
 Zanjoe Marudo as David Ilustre – Founder of David Ilustre Architecture and Designs, and head of Illustre Contractors. Jill’s philandering husband, Gio’s father, and Lexy’s paramour of 2 years.
 Sue Ramirez as Alexis "Lexy" Lucero – Fred and Nathalia's daughter and David's mistress of 2 years. Originally planned to finish her business degree despite her wealthy background. Later on, Lexy marries David and has a daughter with him named Kylie.
 Zaijian Jaranilla as Gio V. Ilustre – David and Jill's son. A top student at Salidummay Academy, his parents’ issues eventually affect his well-being. Gio’s motivation in academics, extracurricular activities, and his friendships deteriorate as his mind is plagued with his family’s problems.

Supporting
 Jane Oineza as Diane Riagon – A medical student at Pine Hill University Hospital who helps Jill confirm David's infidelity.
 Joem Bascon as Lorenzo "Enzo" Tierra – Diane's errant boyfriend who holds a grudge against Jill. Works at the arcade where Gio and his friends frequent.
 Rachel Alejandro as Nathalia Lucero – Jill's patient and friend, Fred's wife, and Lexy's mother. At first against her daughter’s relationship with a married man, she and her husband become blind-sided later on and accept David. 
 Angeli Bayani as Dr. Sandra "Sandy" M. Alipio, M.D. – Jill's medical school colleague and David's friend. Specializes in OB-GYN at Pine Hill Medical Hospital.
 Ketchup Eusebio as Charlie Manansala – David's neighbor, accountant, business partner, and university colleague, and Carol’s womanizing husband.
 Bianca Manalo as Carol Manansala – Charlie's wife who becomes suspicious of her husband’s unfaithful demeanor, and Jill's neighbor and friend.
 Jef Gaitan as Bani De Vera – A provincial resident-turned-nurse who supports Jill in her medical missions.
 Empress Schuck as Grace Jimenez – David's secretary and Mikah's mother.
 Sandino Martin as Dr. Barry V. Inocencio, M.D. – Jill and Sandy's co-worker at Pine Hill Medical Hospital. Like Jill, he also specializes in internal medicine.
 Art Acuña as Alfred "Fred" Lucero – Owner of Lucero Builders, a large property developer, and Lucero Land. Nathalia's husband and Lexy's father.
 Malou Crisologo as Margarita "Maggie" Dimanansala – The nanny of the Lucero household.
 Franco Laurel as Atty. Dante Pugong -   Jill's patient and annulment lawyer.
 Lao Rodriguez as Ben Manaloto - Jill’s patient who provides her with a new office space.
 Hannah Ledesma as Dr. Claire Fuentebella, M.D. - The HR manager at Pine Hill Medical Hospital, and David’s friend. Specializes in psychiatry.
 Brent Manalo as Miguel "Migs" Illustre – David's younger brother who works at his brother’s company.
 Migs Almendras as Justin Cruz – Lexy's friend.
 Avery Clyde Balasbas as Mikah Jimenez – Grace's daughter and Gio's friend. A student at Salidummay Academy.
 JB Agustin as Maximo "Max" Asuncion – Gio and Mikah’s friend. A student at Salidummay Academy.
 Jie-Ann Armero as Janice Ilustre - David and Migs’ cousin.

Special participation
 Ronnie Lazaro as Dr. Jose Alindayo, M.D. – Jill's mentor and father figure.
 Susan Africa as Marina Ilustre† – David and Migs’ mother.
 Jake Ejercito as Gabriel "Gabby" Gomez – A science teacher and basketball coach at Salidummay Academy.

Episodes

Season 1

Season 2

Production

Background and development 
The Broken Marriage Vow is a Filipino remake of Doctor Foster, created and written by Mike Bartlett and produced by BBC One. The Philippines is the sixth country in the world to adapt the hit drama from the United Kingdom.

The project was first announced on April 13, 2021, after ABS-CBN signed an agreement with BBC Studios to do the Philippine adaptation. The series will be directed by Connie Macatuno, who previously served as the director of Precious Hearts Romances Presents: Paraiso.

Table-read session for the cast was held on June 22, 2021.

Casting 
The first four cast members were revealed on May 7, 2021. Jodi Sta. Maria will play as the lead character Dr. Jill Ilustre, with Zanjoe Marudo as the husband David Illustre, and Sue Ramirez as the mistress Lexy Lucero. Zaijian Jaranilla will portray as the son Gio Illustre. On June 14, 2021, the rest of the cast were announced, which includes Jane Oineza and Empress Schuck. On December 1, 2021  Jake Ejercito has been cast in the series with an undisclosed role. On his social media account, Ejercito announced on December 10, 2021, that he will portray the role of Gabby on the series.

Filming 
Filming started in July 2021 in Baguio with a lock-in taping set-up and ended on December 22, 2021.

Timeslot change
On May 16, 2022, after Viral Scandal ended, The Broken Marriage Vow was moved to a later timeslot at 9:30 PM to give way for 2 Good 2 Be True.

Marketing 
The first half-minute teaser was released on December 1, 2021, showing the first glimpse of the main characters. Philippine media Rappler said that the teaser has trending scenes that are reminiscent to the South Korean series The World of the Married (made its premiere since June 15, 2020). 5 teasers in total are released showing a few scenes from the series before the release of the full trailer. The official trailer has been released on December 15, 2021, together with a live reaction from the main cast.  On January 6, 2022, a new teaser was released showing new clips and introducing cast members. A midseason trailer was released on February 24, 2022.

The official poster was released on January 3, 2022, and was designed by Justin Besana. On March 1, 2022, a midseason poster was released and also designed by Besana.

Reception
Upon its premiere, The Broken Marriage Vow already captivated the eyes of the viewers, becoming the most viewed Asian drama on Viu in the Philippines consistently.

Awards and nominations

Original soundtrack

Release
A special screening of the pilot episode was released on January 17, 2022, on ktx.ph.

On January 15, 2022, it was also announced that ABS-CBN Entertainment made a partnership with Asian entertainment content platform, Viu. The series premiered on Viu 48 hours ahead of the TV premiere.

Notes

References

External links 
 

2022 Philippine television series debuts
2022 Philippine television series endings
ABS-CBN drama series
Adultery in television
Doctor Foster
Filipino-language television shows
Philippine melodrama television series
Philippine thriller television series
Psychological thriller television series
Philippine television series based on British television series
Television series by Dreamscape Entertainment Television
Television shows set in the Philippines